Traffic is a 2011 Indian Malayalam-language road action thriller film written by brothers Bobby and Sanjay and directed by Rajesh Pillai. The film features an ensemble cast consisting of Sreenivasan, Kunchacko Boban, Asif Ali, Vineeth Sreenivasan, Rahman, Anoop Menon, Sandhya, Roma, Remya Nambeesan, Namitha Pramod, Lena, Jose Prakash and Krishna. The film has its narrative in a hyperlink format. The film opened on 7 January 2011, to a positive reception. It is widely regarded as one of the defining movies of the Malayalam New Wave. A multi-narrative thriller that intertwines multiple stories around one particular incident, Traffic is inspired from an actual event that happened in Chennai. Owing to its critical and commercial success, Traffic was remade into Tamil as Chennaiyil Oru Naal, in Kannada as Crazy Star and is also remade in Hindi, with the same name. This was also the last film of the veteran actor Jose Prakash. The film has a cult status.

Plot
On 16 September, superstar Sidharth Shankar gets ready for the release of his new film. On the same day, Traffic Constable Sudevan joins back on duty, after having been suspended from service for taking bribe as he wanted to pay the fees for his niece's admission. The day is special for Dr. Abel who is celebrating his first wedding anniversary. Raihan, an aspiring television journalist, starts his first job with an interview with Siddharth Shankar the very same day.

On the same day, at a crowded traffic junction in Kochi, Raihan and Rajeev, travelling in a bike are fatally hit by a speeding car at the signal, when Raihan was all set to interview, Siddharth. Also at the junction, in another car, is the Dr. Abel.

Raihan goes into coma and is declared brain dead although he is kept alive using ventilator in Lakeshore Hospital Kochi. Meanwhile, Siddharth's ailing daughter Riya's condition becomes worse. She is admitted to Ahalya Hospital Palakkad and she urgently needs a heart transplant. At first, Raihan's parents do not agree to take their son off the ventilator and donate their son's heart but Rajeev and Raihan's girlfriend Aditi persuade them into it. Now that the heart is available, the problem was with transporting it from Kochi to Palakkad. No helicopters or chartered flights are available due to bad weather and time concerns and so the heart will have to be taken by road. Someone will have to drive the 150 kilometres from Lakeshore Hospital in Kochi to Ahalya Hospital in Palakkad in under two hours during the rush traffic.

City Police Commissioner Ajmal Nazar is asked to carry out the mission. He initially refuses considering the complexity and risk involved in the mission. But finally, he heeds to the persuasion of Dr. Simon D'Souza. Sudevan, being an experienced driver who has driven as an escort for ministers, volunteers to be the driver of the Mahindra Scorpio which will transport the heart because he wanted to regain the name he lost due to the bribe incident. Accompanying him on this mission is Dr. Abel and Rajeev.

Everything goes smoothly for some time. But at a point Dr. Abel threatens Sudevan that he would kill Rajeev if he didn't comply, forcing Sudevan to deviate from the highway into a forest road (Puttukad forest area) in order to save himself from the police. However, Rajeev retaliates leading to a fight. He phones his sister Miriam and speaks that he had hit his wife Shwetha with a car as he was infuriated with the fact that she was cheating on him with his best friend Jikku and that she has possibly died, so he wishes to save himself from the clutches of the police. Here, Siddharth phones him and convinces him that he can save Abel, however, Abel is shown not to be so convinced. In the nick of time, Siddharth's wife Sruthi explains her mental traumatic condition due to the heart problem of her daughter for the last 13 years and explains that no other problem can be bigger than this one. Abel now convinced, advises Sudevan and Rajeev to leave. However, Sudevan decides to have Abel with them in the team and in spite of the repeated suggestions from the Commissioner Nazar to get him arrested.

They are then shown to enter a road 8 km ahead of the route time table, thus making up for the time they lost in the forest. However, after some time Riya's conditions worsen, forcing the team to take an alternate route through a communally sensitive place called Bilal Colony, where the police cannot enter the place due to its strong minority. Rajeev, who knew the place well and advises Siddharth Shankar to get the place cleared for the vehicle to move. Siddharth Shankar personally phones Thanzeer, his Fan Club President who goes out of his ways and means to clear roads for the vehicle. Rajeev exits the vehicle as soon as they enter the colony to ensure the roads are clear. In midway, Abel also exits the vehicle to remove two vehicles which are blocking the route. After which Abel boards the car with Thanzeer's assistance, however, Rajeev is unable to board the car. Sudevan drives at high speeds and ensures that they reach Ahalya Hospital on time. Covering the challenging 150 km feat in a daunting 1 hour and 58 minutes.

Abel finds out that Shwetha is out of danger and has no complaints regarding the accident against Abel, thus freeing him. Rajeev is offered a lift to Kochi by an unnamed man. Raihan's parents invite Aditi home as a symbol of acceptance and prepare for the last rites of Raihan. Riya opens her eyes, bringing joy to her family, Nazar feels a sense of satisfaction and phones Dr. Simon D'Souza to thank him. Sudevan en route to his home finds a few people fighting on the road regarding a minor accident, where he signals them to stop the fight. Thus the movie ends on a happy note.

Cast

 Sreenivasan as Sudevan Nair, a head constable in Kochi City Traffic Police
 Kunchacko Boban as Dr. Abel Thariyan, a cardiac surgeon at Lakeshore Hospital, Kochi
 Asif Ali as Rajeev Menon, Raihan's best friend
 Vineeth Sreenivasan as Raihan Saifudeen, A journalist trainee working in Indiavision
 Anoop Menon as SP Ajmal Nazar IPS, City Police Commissioner of Kochi
 Rahman as Siddharth Shankar, a Malayalam Cine Megastar
 Sandhya as Aditi, Raihan's girlfriend and a divorcee 
 Roma as Miriam, Abel's sister working in Club FM 
 Remya Nambeesan as Shwetha, Abel's wife
 Namitha Pramod as Riya, Sidharth Shankar's daughter
 Lena as Shruthi, Sidharth Shankar's wife
 Sai Kumar as Dr. Saifudeen, a surgeon and Raihan's father
 Fathima Babu as Raihan's mother
 Vijayakumar as Mathew, private secretary to Siddharth Shankar
 Dr. Rony David as Charlie, Journalist
 Krishna as Jicku, a common friend of Abel and Shwetha who has an affair with Shwetha
 Reena Basheer as Sudevan's wife
 Nisha Sarang as Sudevan's sister
 Prem Prakash as a doctor
 Renjith Reghu as Deepu
 Mahima as Aditi's friend
 Baiju Ezhupunna as Thanzeer, the Siddharth Shankar Fans Club President of Bilal Colony
 Akhil S. Prasad as Ajaz, Miriam's brother
 Jose Prakash as Dr. Simon D'Souza (guest appearance)
 Nivin Pauly as a man in a car (special appearance)
 Gowri Krishnan as Sudevan's Daughter (special appearance)

Production
The film is directed by Rajesh Pillai. Writers of the film Bobby and Sanjay, who scripted Ente Veedu Appuvinteyum and Notebook explain: "The director wanted the film to be of a different mould altogether. Here every character is of equal importance as the story moves ahead. It was quite a challenging task but an enjoyable experience as well." They add that the film is inspired by a true incident. A similar mission was successfully carried out by the Tamil Nadu police in a more complex Chennai city. Also, in a scene, the character played by Anoop Menon talks about the incident.

Traffic is one of the first multi narratives made in this decade in Malayalam film. The film has Sreenivasan, Rahman, Kunchacko Boban and Asif Ali as the four lead protagonists whose stories are narrated through the sequences. Vineeth Sreenivasan, who recently made his debut as a writer and director with Malarvadi Arts Club, says that it was the exciting script that attracted him to the project. "It is a particularly exciting day for my character as he is all set to join a news channel but as it turns out fate had other plans in store for him," adds the actor.
On the theme, Rajesh says, "I felt it was a theme that could connect with viewers regardless of their age. It's a contemporary theme that reassures us that if we approach something with honesty, even nature will come to our support." The film will be the second on-screen pairing of Vineeth and Sreenivasan, after their first film Makante Achan. Sandhya plays Aditi, who is in love with Raihan. "Aditi is perhaps more worldly-wise than usual for someone her age. But she has her own reasons for being so", says the Malayali actor who created quite a stir with her performance in the Tamil film. This movie was said to be better than its other remakes.

Reception

Critical response
The film opened on 7 January 2011 to positive reviews. Veeyen of Nowrunning.com gave the film 3 out of 5 stars, writing, "Rajesh Pillai's Traffic is a brutally brilliant film in which he lends color to coincidence and unveils before us cogitation on the dynamics of chance. A strikingly crafted film that is raw and genuine, it crawls right under your skin and stays there." IndiaGlitz enthusiastically praised the film's "riveting plot, great performances, soulful music... and skillful direction". A review at Cinefundas also praised the acting, adding that "the real hero of the film is the script". Sify.com called it "an overwhelming experience" and rated it as "very good." The Malayalam website Movieraga called it an "excellent movie" and went on to state that the new blood of Malayalam cinema cannot be seen as second-grade any more. The movie was part of the series of movies that began the New Generation Movement.

Traffic was screened in the Malayalam Cinema Today section at the 16th International Film Festival of Kerala (IFFK), in Thiruvananthapuram, Kerala in 2011.

Box office
The film received highly positive reviews and become a blockbuster at box office.

Soundtrack

Remakes

Owing to its critical and commercial success, Traffic was remade in Tamil as Chennaiyil Oru Naal (2013), which was a huge success at box office like Traffic. Kannada remake Crazy Star (2014) received negative reception from both critics and box-office. Traffic's Hindi remake was released in May 2016.

Awards

References

External links 

 
 Traffic at Nowrunning.com
 Traffic at Oneindia.in
 Traffic review at Rediff.com

Further reading
 "A true heart touching story (The incident on which the film is based on)".

2011 films
Indian road movies
2010s Malayalam-language films
2010s road movies
2010s thriller films
Indian films based on actual events
Malayalam films remade in other languages
Films with screenplays by Bobby-Sanjay
Indian nonlinear narrative films
Fictional portrayals of the Kerala Police
Films shot in Kochi
Hyperlink films
Films directed by Rajesh Pillai